The Annenberg Space for Photography (2009 - 2020) was an exhibition space in the Century City neighborhood of Los Angeles' Westside. Founded in March 2009, it was dedicated to displaying photographic works, ranging from artistic to journalistic, using both traditional photographic prints and modern digital techniques.

History
The goal, according to project creator Wallis Annenberg was to encourage visitors to see the world in a new way and gain understanding of the human condition through the eyes of gifted photographers. 

As part of the Walls: Defend, Divide, and the Divine exhibition running from October 5, 2019, to December 29, 2019, was Light the Barricades, an interactive public art installation by Candy Chang and James A. Reeves. The goal of the installation was to encourage viewers to contemplate the inner obstructions that are preventing them from reaching their goals and being their authentic selves. Compound of three walls, as described by Chang herself, each one “shines a light on a particular emotional barrier—resentment, judgement, doubt. On one side of the wall there was a fable that illuminates that topic…on the other side of the wall were three stools where people can sit down and contemplate a particular question related to the topic.” The installation consisted of three 8’ x 27’ solar-powered walls illuminated from within (similar to a photographer’s lightbox).

Tenth anniversary event
On April 25, 2019, to celebrate its 10th anniversary The Annenberg Space for Photography hosted a celebration featuring the opening of two separate photography exhibitions, Contact High: A Visual History Of Hip Hop in conjunction with the west coast debut of Photoville, NYC's largest photography festival.

Closure 
On June 8, 2020, founder Wallis Annenberg announced that The Annenberg Space for Photography would not reopen following its temporary closure as a result of the COVID-19 emergency. Exhibits posted on the website would continue to be available. Over the past 10 years, the space has staged 31 exhibitions visited by almost 1 million people. The exhibition space donated more than 900 high quality prints of 329 contemporary photographers to the Library of Congress, where they could be accessed online.

References

External links
 Annenberg Space for Photography Collection of Exhibition Prints at the Library of Congress

Century City, Los Angeles
Art galleries established in 2009
Photography museums and galleries in the United States
Art museums and galleries in Los Angeles
2009 establishments in California
2020 disestablishments in California